Johannes Servaas Germishuys, best known as Gerrie Germishuys (born 29 October 1949 in Port Shepstone, Natal) is a former South African rugby union player who played wing for the Springboks.

Biography

As a winger, Germishuys was known for his speed and agility. His international rugby debut was on 22 June 1974 for the Springboks against the British Lions. He also played against the All Blacks in 1976 and the Lions in 1980. In 1981, he participated in the infamous South Africa rugby team tour of New Zealand. His last cap was on 20 September 1981 against the United States rugby team. He also played in the Currie Cup competition for the provincial teams of the Orange Free State from 1974-1977 and the Transvaal from 1980-1981.

National team statistics

 20 selections between  1974 and 1981 for the South African Rugby team
 48 points (12 tries)
 Selections by year: 1 in 1974, 4 in 1976, 1 in 1977, 9 in 1980 and 5 in 1981

Test history

See also
List of South Africa national rugby union players – Springbok no. 465

References

External links
 Springbok Rugby Hall of Fame

1949 births
Living people
People from Port Shepstone
Afrikaner people
South African rugby union players
South Africa international rugby union players
Rugby union wings
Rugby union players from KwaZulu-Natal
Free State Cheetahs players